is a district in Hyōgo Prefecture, Japan.

Towns
Taka

Mergers
On 1 October 2005, the town of Kurodashō merged into the city of Nishiwaki.
On 1 November 2005, the towns of Kami, Naka and Yachiyo merged to form the new town of Taka.

Places of note
 Central Circuit motor racing circuit

Districts in Hyōgo Prefecture